D'Anthony William Carlos (born May 17, 1993), better known by his stage name GoldLink, is an American rapper and singer. In 2014, he released his debut mixtape, The God Complex, which received critical acclaim. In June 2015, GoldLink was chosen as part of the XXL Freshman Class. In October 2015, he released his second mixtape, And After That, We Didn't Talk, which was supported by the singles "Dance on Me" and "Spectrum". His debut album, At What Cost, was released in March 2017 to positive reviews. The album's lead single, "Crew" (featuring Brent Faiyaz and Shy Glizzy), peaked at number 45 on the Billboard Hot 100 chart and earned GoldLink his first Grammy nomination. His second studio album, Diaspora, was released in June 2019.

Early life
GoldLink's father was a parks and recreation worker and his mother a secretary at a law firm. After his parents separated, GoldLink moved to Bowie, Maryland with his mother and eventually settled in Virginia. He graduated from Hayfield Secondary School in Alexandria, Virginia.

Career

2013–16: Beginnings and breakthrough

GoldLink began his career performing under his birth name D'Anthony Carlos. He began making music as a hobby after graduating high school at Hayfield Secondary School, eventually recording tracks in a local studio in Falls Church, Virginia named Indie Media Lab. He released his first tracks on Bandcamp under the name Gold Link James. It was in 2013 that he began performing as GoldLink, releasing several free tracks on SoundCloud.

GoldLink released his first mixtape The God Complex in July 2014. Complex named it one of the best projects released during the first half of 2014, Spin placed it at number 19 on its The 40 Best Hip-Hop Albums of 2014, Clash ranked it at number 7 on their Top 10 Mixtapes of 2014 and Pitchfork Media gave the mixtape a 7.9 rating.

GoldLink began collaborating with producer Rick Rubin in 2015. In November 2015 he released the mixtape After That, We Didn't Talk, much of which was considered a follow-up to questions left unanswered from The God Complex. Pigeons & Planes placed it at number 19 on its Best Albums of 2015 list. GoldLink was also named a member of the XXL Freshman Class in 2015. In 2016, GoldLink signed a major deal with RCA Records and revealed he is working on his second album. He released the single "Fall In Love" featuring rapper Cisero and produced by Canadian band BADBADNOTGOOD and Canadian producer and DJ Kaytranada. He later released the song "Untitled" with TDE rapper Isaiah Rashad.

2017–present: At What Cost and Diaspora

In February 2017, Goldlink took part in "Red Bull Sound Selects" reputable 3 Days Miami among artists Kelela, Angel Olsen, Brika, and others. On March 24, 2017, he released his debut album, At What Cost, featuring guest appearances from Wale, Shy Glizzy, Steve Lacy, Jazmine Sullivan, Kaytranada, Mýa, Ciscero, Kokayi, Hare Squead, Radiant Children, April George and Lil Dude. The project debuted at number 128 on the US Billboard 200 chart. It was preceded by the singles "Crew" and "Meditation". "Crew" has peaked at number 45 on the US Billboard Hot 100, becoming his highest charting single in the country. It was also nominated for Best Rap/Sung Performance at the 60th Annual Grammy Awards.

On June 7, 2018, GoldLink was featured on the song "Like I Do" by American singer Christina Aguilera from her eighth studio album, Liberation, which was nominated for Best Rap/Sung Performance at the 61st Annual Grammy Awards.

On June 12, 2019, GoldLink released his second studio album Diaspora. In an interview with Wonderland Magazine, he said that he considered "At What Cost" to be his breakout mixtape due to a label agreement and "Diaspora" as his debut album.

On June 18, 2021, GoldLink released his third studio album Haram!. In the run up to the album release, GoldLink began trolling some of his fellow rappers, tweeting insults and threats at Sheck Wes and sporting a fake facial jewel on his forehead in a July 13, 2021 The Tonight Show Starring Jimmy Fallon appearance, in apparent mockery of the facial jewelry trend popularized by Lil Uzi Vert and Sauce Walka. In the album's first single, "White Walls," GoldLink continued his disses of Sheck Wes. The feud with Wes dates back to 2019 when GoldLink's then-girlfriend Justine Skye accused Wes of abuse, stalking, and harassment.

Controversy

Mac Miller comments 
On November 26, 2019, GoldLink wrote a post on Instagram that outlined both his appreciation for Pittsburgh rapper Mac Miller, who died of an accidental overdose in 2018, and his belief the late star intentionally cribbed the sound of And After That, We Didn't Talk for Miller's album The Divine Feminine. GoldLink claimed he showed Miller his album while they were on tour together for Miller's previous album GO:OD AM and wrote the rapper loved it and had him play it for the whole touring crew. GoldLink pointed to similarities in the albums' structure and use of singer Anderson Paak for a lead single. Paak responded in an Instagram post of his own, slamming GoldLink for having a "God Complex" and being disrespectful in the wake of their friend's death. On November 28, 2019, GoldLink spoke on the war of words at a concert in Hamburg, Germany, focusing on the love he expressed in the post for Miller and emphasizing he never accused the deceased rapper of stealing or copying.

Discography

Studio albums

Mixtapes

Singles

As lead artist

As featured artist

Other certified songs

Guest appearances

Awards and nominations

References

External links
goldlink
 

1993 births
21st-century American male musicians
21st-century American rappers
African-American male rappers
American hip hop singers
Living people
Rappers from Washington, D.C.
RCA Records artists